Reddick is a town in Marion County, Florida, United States. As of the 2020 census, the town population was 449, down from 506 in 2010. It is part of the Ocala Metropolitan Statistical Area.

Geography
Reddick is located in northern Marion County at  (29.370828, –82.198368).

Demographics

At the 2000 census there were 571 people, 203 households, and 146 families in the town. The racial makeup of the town was 52.19% White, 42.21% African American, 0.18% Pacific Islander, 3.15% from other races, and 2.28% from two or more races. Hispanic or Latino of any race were 6.65%.

Of the 203 households 33.5% had children under the age of 18 living with them, 46.8% were married couples living together, 16.3% had a female householder with no husband present, and 27.6% were non-families. 24.6% of households were one person and 14.8% were one person aged 65 or older.  The average household size was 2.81 and the average family size was 3.31.

The age distribution was 32.0% under the age of 18, 8.2% from 18 to 24, 24.7% from 25 to 44, 21.7% from 45 to 64, and 13.3% 65 or older.  The median age was 34 years. For every 100 females, there were 96.2 males.  For every 100 females age 18 and over, there were 95.0 males.

The median household income was $33,875 and the median family income  was $36,944. Males had a median income of $22,143 versus $15,833 for females. The per capita income for the town was $13,338.  About 10.6% of families and 18.3% of the population were below the poverty line, including 16.7% of those under age 18 and 16.7% of those age 65 or over.

History
A post office has been in operation at Reddick since 1882. John Reddick, the first postmaster, gave the community his last name.

The film Jeepers Creepers was shot in Reddick during summer 2000. The old Reddick High School was used as the police station in the film.

In 1998, a group of nuns formed the Annunciation of the Theotokos Monastery with the approval of Greek Orthodox Archdiocese of America.

See also

 List of towns in Florida

References

External links

 

Towns in Marion County, Florida
Towns in Florida